Daba is a town under the administration of Heping County, Guangdong, China. , it administers Jiedao Residential Community and the following 15 villages:
Longshi Village
Jinxing Village
Shibei Village
Shuibei Village
Chaotian Village
Shangzhen Village
Tanghu Village
Heshui Village
Etang Village
Shigu Village
Shijing Village
Pingxi Village
Bankeng Village
Gaofa Village
Laozhen Village

References 

Towns in Guangdong
Heping County